The 1987 Paris–Roubaix was the 85th running of the Paris–Roubaix single-day cycling race. The race was won by Belgian Eric Vanderaerden.

Results

References

1987
1987 in road cycling
1987 in French sport
1987 Super Prestige Pernod International